Beautiful Stranger is the ninth novel in the A-list series, written by Zoey Dean.

Plot
The novel picks up at the Ben-Hur wrap party where Cammie is extremely embarrassed that Adam didn't show up, per her ultimatum. Anna and Ben leave the party to go for a walk and Ben tells Anna about how he loves working at Trieste so much that he wants to open up his own nightclub. Anna is not exactly thrilled as she is starting Yale University in the fall and is unsure how she and Ben will continue their relationship. Still, they joke about possible club locations and Ben falls in love with an abandoned auto shop Anna points out. He draws up a proposal and asks his father for a loan but is denied. Ben's father suggests finishing school would be the better idea and Anna agrees. Ben gets angry with Anna and accuses her of not supporting his dream. The two break up once more and Anna is left alone as Caine decided to get back together with his ex-girlfriend.

Meanwhile, Eduardo proposes to Sam and, despite her initial hesitation, she accepts. However, Eduardo is called away to New York on business and Sam is a little insulted he didn't invite her along. Anna decides to go back to New York to attend an incoming students mixer for Yale and Sam tags along, hoping to surprise Eduardo. The two bump into Logan Cresswell, a former classmate of Anna's, who is just as cute as she remembered him. Anna and Logan date casually while she's in the city and realize how similar they are: they are both intelligent overthinkers who feel insecure about college. Anna is thrilled to find another person who feels as lost as she is and thinks that perhaps this means college won't be so bad while Logan believes that perhaps this means that school may not be for him. Logan invites Anna to come to Bali with him to check out his father's new hotel but she declines, afraid to tread off the beaten path.

Also while in New York, Sam is annoyed that Eduardo is spending so much time at work and is acting so secretive. She fears he is cheating on her with Gisella and, when she sees them together, accuses Eduardo of cheating and calls off their engagement. Back in L.A., she becomes embarrassed when she finds out Eduardo asked Gisella to sketch designs for her wedding dress. The two make up once more.

Cammie pounces on Ben almost immediately after his breakup and becomes his business partner in the opening of his club, Bye Bye Love, as an excuse to get closer to him although she is surprised at how dedicated she is to their venture. Unfortunately, many problems start popping up for the two: water damage delays renovations and their DJ is poached by the Russian Mafia. Thankfully, things come together for opening night and all of the A-list crew is there to help celebrate. Ben and Cammie kiss and Adam shows up, just in time to punch him out. Logan also shows up and gives Anna one last chance to accompany him to Bali. Anna accepts and the novel ends with her boarding the plane at the last minute.

References

American young adult novels
Little, Brown and Company books
2007 American novels
Novels set in New York City